Eamon Michael Ryan (born 28 July 1963) is an Irish Green Party politician who has served as Minister for the Environment, Climate and Communications and Minister for Transport since June 2020 and Leader of the Green Party since May 2011. He has been a Teachta Dála (TD) for the Dublin Bay South constituency since 2016, and previously from 2002 to 2011 for the Dublin South constituency. He previously served as Minister for Communications, Energy and Natural Resources from 2007 to 2011.

Early and personal life
Ryan was born in Dublin in 1963 and raised in Dundrum, where he continues to live with his family. He was educated at Gonzaga College and University College Dublin, where he graduated with a Bachelor of Commerce degree. He was manager of the UCD Marketing Development Programme from 1985 to 1986, and following three years of emigration and unemployment in 1989, he founded Cycling Safaris, a company which organises cycling holidays in Ireland and Europe. He married the author and journalist Victoria White in 1998 and they have four children.

Political career
He first became involved in politics in 1998, when he was co-opted to Dublin City Council, taking up the seat previously held by John Gormley. He topped the poll at the 1999 local elections in the Rathmines local electoral area. From 1995 to 2002, he served on the advisory committee of the Dublin Transport Office. At the 2002 general election, he was first elected to Dáil Éireann as a Green Party TD for the Dublin South constituency. He served as Green Party Spokesperson for Transport, Enterprise, Trade and Employment and Communications, Marine and Natural Resources during the 29th Dáil.

He announced on 13 September 2004, that he intended to seek his party's nomination to be a candidate in the 2004 presidential election. However, when it was announced that the incumbent, Mary McAleese, was seeking a second term he withdrew. His campaign was also hit by his admission of cannabis use, an illegal drug.

Government: 2007–2011

He was re-elected to the Dáil at the 2007 general election held on 24 May. On 13 June, the Green Party voted in favour of entering into a coalition government with Fianna Fáil and the Progressive Democrats at a special party convention. Ryan was appointed to the cabinet by Taoiseach Bertie Ahern, as Minister for Communications, Energy and Natural Resources when the 30th Dáil sat the following day.

As Minister, he stated his priorities would be to improve upon the changes underway in the Irish energy sector, with strong emphasis on aiding the adaptation of renewables and building retrofitting. He also aimed to enhance communications infrastructure where Ireland had fallen behind other countries. During his period in office, installed wind capacity in Ireland doubled, and by 2010 the average daily energy derived from renewable sources (as a percentage of total demand) had increased to 17%, peaking at 42%. He also committed Ireland to the European Super Grid programme in 2009 and announced major government investment in marine energy research projects. Government schemes were expanded for home energy retrofitting as uptake increased, the National Broadband Scheme was completed, a Broadband for Schools Scheme launched, and a national electric vehicle and chargepoint initiative was announced in conjunction with the ESB Electric Ireland and Peugeot Citroën, which was subsequently implemented by the new government.

In response to the Corrib gas controversy, the environmental activist organisation Shell to Sea and its spokesperson Maura Harrington, criticised Ryan for joining Fianna Fáil in coalition as the terms of the programme for government did not include a reversal or renegotiation of the proposed gas pipeline and refinery at Broadhaven Bay, County Mayo. Before entering into government, Ryan supported the aims of the Shell to Sea campaign and attended their protests. Ryan was also criticised by Shell to Sea for failing to launch an independent review of the decision, as stipulated by the Green Party in a motion passed at their annual convention in 2007.

Ryan resigned as Minister for Communications, Energy and Natural Resources on 23 January 2011, when the Green Party withdrew from government. The following day he helped broker an agreement with Fine Gael and the Labour Party which ensured the passing of the 2011 Finance bill, prior to the holding of the general election on the 25 February 2011. He lost his seat at election, receiving 6.8% of the vote. As part of his pension Ryan will receive a lump sum of €110,000 and an annual pension of €51,000 when he is 65, in 2028.

Green Party leader in opposition: 2011–2020
He was one of three candidates to contest the subsequent Green Party leadership election of May 2011. He was elected leader on 27 May 2011, succeeding John Gormley. The party had no representation in the Oireachtas when he became leader.

In 2012, he became an associate with E3G working on an assessment of the development potential of the North Seas Offshore Grid Initiative in a project which was supported by the European Climate Foundation and the Children's Investment Fund Foundation. In 2013, he organised two climate gatherings which brought international climate experts to Ireland to examine what new narratives are needed to increase public support for action on the climate issue.

He was the Green Party candidate in the Dublin constituency at the 2014 European Parliament election, but was not elected. He was elected a TD for the Dublin Bay South constituency in the 2016 general election, alongside deputy leader Catherine Martin who secured a seat in Dublin Rathdown. The Greens' return to the Dáil following their wipeout in 2011 was the first time in Irish election history that a political party had been able to survive losing all their TDs.

In 2019, Ryan called for wolves to be reintroduced to Ireland. Fine Gael rejected this suggestion, with Minister for Culture, Heritage and the Gaeltacht Josepha Madigan responding that her department had no plans to reintroduce wolves into the country, saying that the "large predator" doing so would do damage to farming. He reiterated the following January that he would like to see them introduced in his lifetime. Also in 2019, comments he made on car use in rural Ireland which were published in an article by The Irish Times was criticised online. The newspaper also stated that Ryan suggested that a village of 300 people needs just 30 cars to operate. In the article, Ryan stated people could walk to a pick-up point or cycle. Responding to the article, the party took issue with the headline, and in a statement said the original headline ("You don't need to own a car to live in rural Ireland" - Green Party T.D') had caused “a flood of online fury – and rightly so, because a suggestion like that would be ridiculous and impractical”.

In February 2020, the Green Party had its best election result in the general election of that year, with the party increasing its representation in the Dáil to 12 TDs. Ryan was re-elected in the Dublin Bay South constituency, topping the poll with 22.4% of the first-preference votes.

In March 2020, in a speech in a debate on responses to the COVID-19 pandemic crisis, he made comments on growing food in the event of a supply crisis that went viral online, saying, "we'll have our salads ready to go!" In June 2020, he was criticised online, particularly by Green Party councillors, for his use of the phrase "you nigger" when quoting director Sean Gallen on his experiences of racism. Gallen himself said that Ryan's intentions were "really good" as he tried "to bring up this big issue of racism within an Irish context". Ryan publicly apologised the same day as the speech.

Government: 2020–present
On 27 June 2020, following 139 days of negotiations, the members of Fianna Fáil, Fine Gael and the Green Party all voted in favour of entering government together as a coalition. There had been concern that the proposal would not be accepted by the Green members, as the proposal required that it pass with 66% of the members in favour it. However, in the end 76% of the Green Party membership voted in favour of the deal. The Irish Times journalist Pat Leahy described the vote to enter government as "vindication" for Ryan's leadership of the party and suggested it would strengthen his hand in the subsequent Green Party leadership contest. Green Party rules require a leadership election within 6 months of a general election in Ireland. Ryan sought re-election, and Deputy Leader Catherine Martin also contested the position, leading to the 2020 Green Party leadership election. Ryan was considered to represent the moderate "Old Guard" who were in favour of entering government while Martin was considered to represent younger, more radical Green party members apprehensive about working with Fianna Fáil or Fine Gael.

On entering the government, Ryan was appointed as Minister for the Environment, Climate and Communications and Minister for Transport.

On 23 July 2020, Ryan was re-elected as Green Party leader, defeating deputy leader Catherine Martin by 994 votes (51.24%) to 946 (48.76%).

In June 2021, Ryan received the Green Leader Award.

On 6 November 2021, Ryan cancelled his trip to the COP26 conference in Glasgow after testing positive for COVID-19. The next day, it was confirmed that he tested negative after taking a second test and would now travel to COP26. On 19 December, Ryan began self-isolating after testing positive for COVID-19. On 13 June 2022, Ryan tested positive for COVID-19 a second time.

On 17 December 2022, he was re-appointed to the same positions following Leo Varadkar's appointment as Taoiseach.

In March 2023, Ryan came under fire for stating that he was opposed to free public transport because it would "increase the level of unncessary trips".

References

External links

Eamon Ryan's page on the Green Party website

 

1963 births
Living people
Alumni of University College Dublin
Green Party (Ireland) TDs
Leaders of the Green Party (Ireland)
Local councillors in Dublin (city)
Members of the 29th Dáil
Members of the 30th Dáil
Members of the 32nd Dáil
People educated at Gonzaga College
Politicians from Dublin (city)
Members of the 33rd Dáil
Ministers for Transport (Ireland)